The 1874 Connecticut gubernatorial election was held on April 6, 1874. Incumbent governor and Democratic nominee Charles R. Ingersoll defeated Republican nominee Henry B. Harrison with 50.87% of the vote.

General election

Candidates
Major party candidates
Charles R. Ingersoll, Democratic
Henry B. Harrison, Republican

Other candidates
Henry D. Smith, Temperance

Results

References

1874
Connecticut
Gubernatorial